Albert Conrad Zirkel (October 23, 1884 – February 3, 1945) was an American wrestler who competed in the 1904 Summer Olympics. In 1904, he won a bronze medal in lightweight category. He was born in Newark, New Jersey.

References

External links
Albert Zirkel's profile at Sports Reference.com

1884 births
1945 deaths
Sportspeople from Newark, New Jersey
Wrestlers at the 1904 Summer Olympics
American male sport wrestlers
Olympic bronze medalists for the United States in wrestling
Medalists at the 1904 Summer Olympics